Thysanodonta is a genus of sea snails, marine gastropod mollusks in the family Calliostomatidae.

Distribution
Species of this marine genus can be found off New Zealand and New Caledonia.

Species
Species within the genus Thysanodonta include:
 Thysanodonta aucklandica Marshall, 1988
 Thysanodonta boucheti Marshall, 1988
 Thysanodonta cassis Vilvens & Maestrati, 2006
 Thysanodonta chesterfieldensis Marshall, 1995
 Thysanodonta diadema Vilvens & Maestrati, 2006
 Thysanodonta eucosmia Marshall, 1995
 Thysanodonta festiva Marshall, 1995
 Thysanodonta opima Marshall, 1995
 Thysanodonta pileum Vilvens & Maestrati, 2006
 Thysanodonta wairua Marshall, 1988

References

 Marshall B.A. (1988) Thysanodontinae: A new subfamily of the Trochidae (Gastropoda). Journal of Molluscan Studies 54: 215–229. page(s): 217
 Marshall, B. A. (1998). Food and feeding mode of Thysanodontinae (Mollusca: Gastropoda: Calliostomatidae. Molluscan Research. 19 (1): 69-72.

External links

 
Calliostomatidae